The following is a comparison of major desktop publishing software.

Overview
This table provides general software information including the developer, latest stable version, the year in which the software was first released, and the license under which it is available.

Operating system
This table gives a comparison of what operating systems are compatible with each software in their latest version.

Input format
This table gives a comparison of the file formats each software can import or open.

Output format
This table gives a comparison of the file formats each software can export or save.

See also
List of desktop publishing software

References

Desktop publishing software
Desktop publishing software